Fredonia Commons Historic District is a national historic district located at Fredonia in Chautauqua County, New York.  The district encompasses the central core of Fredonia; the main civic buildings, churches and commercial structures clustered around the commons.  The district includes approximately 25 structures including the Fenner Fire Station, Village Hall, U.S. Post Office, Darwin R. Baker Library, United Methodist Church, Baptist Church, and Trinity Episcopal Church. Commercial buildings are located along the south side of the commons.

It was listed on the National Register of Historic Places in 1978.

References

Historic districts on the National Register of Historic Places in New York (state)
Historic districts in Chautauqua County, New York
National Register of Historic Places in Chautauqua County, New York